Robert Edwin Morrison (born August 6, 1942) is an American country songwriter based in Nashville. More than 350 of his songs have been recorded. His most successful compositions are the Grammy-winning Kenny Rogers song, "You Decorated My Life" and the Grammy-nominated "Lookin' for Love," the theme song for the 1980 John Travolta film, Urban Cowboy, recorded by Johnny Lee. Morrison was ASCAP's "Country Songwriter of the Year" in 1978, 1980, 1981 and 1982 and was inducted into the Nashville Songwriters Hall of Fame in 2016.

He has a college degree in nuclear engineering  and was a Hollywood film actor and a recording artist prior to becoming a full-time songwriter. His songs have been recorded by artists in a variety of genres, including Reba McEntire, The Carpenters, Sammy Davis Jr., Dottie West, Barbara Mandrell,  Jerry Lee Lewis, the Oak Ridge Boys and Bobby Goldsboro. Morrison was awarded "Songwriter of the Year"(1980) by the Nashville Songwriters Association International (NSAI) and has earned more than 40 ASCAP songwriting citations.

Early life
Morrison was born in Biloxi, Mississippi. His father was a jukebox operator who left the house every two weeks to go to New Orleans to pick up a new stack of 45s to restock the local jukeboxes. Morrison received an athletic scholarship (track) to  Mississippi State University  where his squad won the SEC championship. He graduated with a degree in nuclear engineering in 1965.  A self-taught guitarist, Morrison began playing in local bands at age 15 and later performed in clubs as a solo folk singer. While still in college, he came to the attention of noted producer and record executive John Hammond who signed him to record several singles for Columbia Records. One of those singles, released in 1965, was "The Shadow of Your Smile (Love Theme from The Sandpiper)"; and Morrison was the first singer to record it; however, Morrison's version was eclipsed by subsequent recordings by Tony Bennett and other established artists that made it a hit. Morrison moved to Hollywood in 1967 and worked as a contract actor for Screen Gems and released an album on Capitol Records, entitled "Friends of Mine", which included his original songs. He had a few successes, but after seven years, he gave up his quest for a motion picture career and left Los Angeles.

Career

In 1973 Morrison moved to Nashville with some aspiration to be a recording artist; he released an album "Home Again" (Monument/MG7618) in the pop-rock genre without much success. He got a job as staff writer for Bob Beckham at Nashville's Combine Music and was paired up to write with Johnny MacRae, whom he considered a mentor;  In 1977, Morrison told the Tennessean, "Nashville was kind of the final stand for me... I knew I didn't want to be an engineer, and for a while I thought I wanted to become an actor. But I saw quickly that your body is a very expendable commodity, while songs that you write last forever."  His first hit as a songwriter was "The River's Too Wide", recorded by Olivia Newton-John and Sammy Davis Jr. Some of his other early hits were "Angels, Roses and Rain" (Dickey Lee), "You Lift Me Up to Heaven" (Reba McEntire) and "You're the One" (Oak Ridge Boys). The ABC Television Network used the latter song "You're the One" as the slogan for the network's national promotion in 1978, adapting it to say "We're the One!". To do this, ABC re-recorded the song with different lyrics after they struck an agreement with Morrison.  Morrison says he always has five or ten songs in the works; if one isn't coming along, he rotates to the next one.

Morrison's Grammy-winning song "You Decorated My Life" began as a poem written by Debbie Hupp, a Kentucky mother of five who began writing songs while working in a liquor distillery as a nightwatchman. Hupp and Morrison developed a writing relationship. She brought Morrison the first verse and the title, "You Decorated My Life". Morrison supplied the direction for the second verse, and wrote the chorus melody; together they finished the lyric. Morrison suggested the song to Dottie West, who declined it, but suggested it for Kenny Rogers. Rogers' recording, released in 1979, became a No. 1 hit on the Billboard Country Singles chart, and No. 2 on the Adult Contemporary chart.

Morrison's song "Lookin' for Love" was one of the few huge hits that originated from unsolicited amateur songwriters. Two Gulfport, Mississippi school teachers, Patti Ryan and Wanda Mallette, had songwriting aspirations. When they saw Morrison on television accepting an award for his song "You Decorated My Life" , they realized Mallette's older brother had gone to school with him, so they sent some of their songs to Morrison; he rejected them. After a while, they sent some more songs that showed some improvement and among them was "Lookin' for Love". Morrison revised a couple of lyric lines that didn’t work, cut the bridge in half and changed the chorus melody of the song slightly. Despite the song initially being turned down more than 20 times, Morrison gave a cassette to a friend in Hollywood who dropped it off at Paramount Pictures.  It was chosen by Irving Azoff for the film Urban Cowboy and was sung on the soundtrack by Johnny Lee. It rose to No. 1 on the country charts and No. 5 on the pop charts in 1980.

Other noted songs by Morrison are Gary Morris' "The Love She Found in Me", Conway Twitty's "Don't Call Him a Cowboy", and Highway 101's "Whiskey, If You Were a Woman".  On the craft of songwriting, Morrison stated "Inspiration is fine, but very undependable. It's a very demanding life, and even when you're successful, you're not sure you want it."

Awards and honors
Over 350 songs written or co-written by Morrison have been recorded. A partial list is found here:  :Category: Songs written by Bob Morrison (songwriter).  Morrison was ASCAP's "Country Songwriter of the Year" in 1978, 1980, 1981 and 1982 His songs have been recorded by artists including  The Carpenters, Bobby Vinton, Highway 101, Barbara Mandrell, Jerry Lee Lewis and Bobby Goldsboro. Morrison was awarded "Songwriter of the Year"(1980) by the Nashville Songwriters Association International (NSAI) and, as of 2018, has earned 43 ASCAP songwriting citations. He was inducted into the Nashville Songwriters Hall of Fame in 2016. On the subject of composing songs, Morrison said the inherent constant rejection is hard to overcome. "The enjoyment comes in seeing the results. If you can make people feel something — even if it's rage — then you've done something," he told a reporter.

Personal life

Morrison is tall, standing about 6 ft 3in. According to the Tennessean in 1977, he "has the appearance of a well-kept college athlete". He is one of Nashville's celebrity tennis players and practices often. Morrison said, "To me, these songs of mine are like little children going out into the world...some may be great, and others might fall flat— you just never know".

Notes

References

Living people
1942 births
Singer-songwriters from Mississippi
American country singer-songwriters
Country music composers
Country musicians from Mississippi